Life on the Wire is the fourth studio album by British jazz-funk duo Morrissey–Mullen, released in 1982 by Beggars Banquet Records. It peaked at No. 47 in the UK Albums Chart.

Track listing
Side one
 "Life on the Wire" (Claire Hamill, Jim Mullen) – 5:19
 "Takin' Time" (John Critchinson) – 5:22
 "Face of a Child" (Hamill, Mullen) – 5:55
 "Come and Get Me" (Hamill, Mullen) – 4:37

Side two
"Brazil Nut" (Alan Gorrie) – 5:17
 "Ships that Pass in the Night" (Hamill, Mullen) – 5:04
 "Making Waves" (Critchinson) – 5:20
 "Running Out of Time" (Hamill, Dick Morrissey) – 4:38

Personnel
Credits are adapted from the Life on the Wire liner notes.
 Dick Morrissey — tenor and soprano saxophones; flute
 Jim Mullen — guitar
 Claire Hamill — vocals
 Carol Kenyon — vocals
 Tony Beard — drums
 Chris Fletcher — percussion
 John McKenzie — bass
 John Critchinson — keyboards
 Danny Schogger — synthesizer

Charts

References

External links

1982 albums
Morrissey–Mullen albums
Beggars Banquet Records albums